ZCS may refer to:
 Zimbra (Zimbra Collaboration Suite), a groupware product
 Zero code suppression, a telecommunications technology
 Zero-current switching, a technology used in switched-mode power supplies